Busoni is a commune of Kirundo Province in northern Burundi. The capital is at Busoni.

References

Communes of Burundi
Kirundo Province